The Battle of Merv (or Marv) occurred on 2 December 1510 as a result of the Uzbek invasion of Khorasan. It ended with a decisive victory for the Safavid dynasty. The result was that the Safavids regained control of the Khorasan region (north-eastern and east of present Iran, southern parts of present-day Turkmenistan, and western and northern Afghanistan).

Background
After the Shaybani Uzbeks began to rise to power in Transoxiana around 1495, Muhammad Shaybani Khan was waiting for a chance to annex the territory of the Timurids in Herat, which eventually occurred when the forces of the Uzbek Khan occupied the city and its environs in 1507. Shah Ismail started his campaign in Azerbaijan in 1502, and had re-unified all of Iran by 1509. Badi' al-Zaman Mirza, Sultan Husayn Bayqara's son and heir, sought asylum at Ismail's court and induced him to launch a campaign in the east.

Battle
Shah Ismail reached Khorasan with great speed; Shaybani Khan retreated to Merv castle to await reinforcement from Uzbek tribes. The Safavid army then pretended to retreat, encouraging the Uzbeks to leave the castle in pursuit, only to be ambushed and destroyed by the Qizilbash ("Red Heads") troops of Shah Ismail once they were too far from the castle to regain its safety. The Safavid forces were reportedly heavily outnumbered by the army of Shaybani Khan, who was caught and killed trying to escape the battle. Shah Ismail had his body parts sent to various areas of the empire for display, while famously having his skull coated in gold and made into a jeweled drinking goblet. The primary outcome of the battle renewed Safavid control of Khorasan, the historic region which lies mostly in parts of modern-day Iran, Turkmenistan, and Afghanistan.

See also
Shi'a-Sunni relations
Battle of Ghazdewan

References

Sources 
 
 

Conflicts in 1510
Battles involving Safavid Iran
1510 in Asia
History of Turkmenistan